Lynn Gottlieb (born April 12, 1949, in Bethlehem, Pennsylvania) is an American rabbi in the Jewish Renewal movement.

In 1974, she founded the now-defunct feminist theater troupe Bat Kol.

In 1981, she became the first woman ordained as a rabbi in the Jewish Renewal movement; she was ordained by rabbis Zalman Schachter, Everett Gendler, and Shlomo Carlebach. She authored She Who Dwells Within: A Feminist Vision of a Renewed Judaism (1995).

In 2007 she was selected as one of The Other Top 50 Rabbis by Letty Cottin Pogrebin. Gottlieb led a Fellowship of Reconciliation delegation to Iran in 2008, thus becoming the first female rabbi to visit Iran in a public delegation since the 1979 Iranian Revolution.

A 2013 dissertation from the University of New Mexico's department of anthropology, “Storied Lives in a Living Tradition: Women Rabbis and Jewish Community in 21st Century New Mexico,” by Dr. Miria Kano, discusses Gottlieb and four other female rabbis of New Mexico.

Gottlieb supports the Boycott, Divestment and Sanctions (BDS) campaign.

References

Sources
Biography, Jewish Virtual Library

1950 births
Living people
American Jewish Renewal rabbis
Jewish Renewal women rabbis
20th-century American rabbis
21st-century American rabbis